Club Atlético River Plate Women is the Argentine women's football section of the homonymous club. Established in 1991, it was the inaugural champion of the Women's Primera A. In 2004, its leadership as the team with more championships (including a five-years streak between 1993 and 1997) was reached and surpassed by its archrivals, Boca Juniors.

By March 2019, River Plate had won 11 of the 33 editions of the tournament. It has made one appearance, placing third, at the 2017 Copa Libertadores Femenina.

Players

Current squad
As of 27 february 2023.

Notable players

Honours
 Campeonato de Fútbol Femenino (11): 1991, 1993, 1994, 1995, 1996, 1997, 2002 Ap, 2003 Cl, 2009 Cl, 2010 Cl, 2016–17

References

External links
 

 
Women's football clubs in Argentina
Association football clubs established in 1991
1991 establishments in Argentina